This list is based upon notable restaurants or restaurant chains that originated in Portland, Oregon.

Current

 3 Doors Down Café and Lounge
 Abigail Hall (2018)
 Abyssinian Kitchen
 Akadi
 Ava Gene's
 Alberta Street Pub
 Alibi
 Amalfi's Italian Restaurant (1959)
 Ambassador Restaurant and Lounge
 Andina
 Anna Bannanas Cafe
 Apizza Scholls
 Assembly Brewing (2019)
 Ate-Oh-Ate
 Atlas Pizza (2014)
 Baby Doll Pizza (2012)
 Back Stage Bar
 Baes Fried Chicken (2020)
 Bar Cala (2022)
 Batterfish
 Bear Paw Inn
 Beastro
 Behind the Museum Café
 Bella's Italian Bakery (2018)
 Ben & Esther's Vegan Jewish Deli (2019)
 Berlu (2019)
 Besaw's
 Bing Mi
 Bipartisan Cafe
 Birrieria La Plaza
 Birrieria PDX (2020)
 Bollywood Theater (2012)
 Bread and Ink Cafe
 Bridge City Pizza
 Brix Tavern (2011)
 Bullard Tavern (2018)
 Burger Stevens (2016)
 Cadillac Cafe
 Cafe Nell (2008)
 Caffe Mingo (1991)
 Canard (2018)
 Case Study Coffee Roasters
 Cassidy's Restaurant and Bar (1979)
 Castagna
 Cheerful Bullpen
 Cheryl's on 12th (2012)
 Chicken and Guns
 Chin's Kitchen (1949)
 Cibo (2012)
 Clarklewis
 Cloud City Ice Cream (2011)
 Clyde's Prime Rib
 Coffee Time (1994)
 Coffin Club (2011)
 Coopers Hall Winery and Taproom (2014)
 Coquine
 The Country Cat
 Cricket Cafe
 Crush Bar
 Dan and Louis Oyster Bar
 Davenport (2013)
 Deadstock Coffee
 Delta Cafe (1995)
 Departure Restaurant and Lounge
 Dick's Primal Burger
 Dimo's Apizza (2020)
 Dirty Lettuce (2020)
 Dixie Tavern (2005)
 Doc Marie's (2022)
 Dockside Saloon and Restaurant
 Donnie Vegas (2015)
 Double Dragon (2011)
 Double Mountain Brewery (2016)
 Doug Fir Lounge (2004)
 Dough Zone
 Driftwood Room
 Duck House Chinese Restaurant (2016)
 East Glisan Pizza Lounge
 East India Co. Grill and Bar (2007)
 EastBurn
 Edelweiss Sausage & Delicatessen
 Eem
 El Cubo de Cuba
 Erica's Soul Food (2020)
 Escape from New York Pizza (1983)
 Expatriate
 Farina Bakery (2014)
 Favela Brazilian Cafe (2019)
 The Fields Bar and Grill (2014)
 Fifty Licks
 Fish Sauce (2012)
 Flying Fish Company
 Frank's Noodle House
 Franks-A-Lot
 Fried Egg I'm in Love (2012)
 Frog & Snail (formerly Chez Machin)
 Fuller's Coffee Shop (1947)
 Gado Gado (2019)
 Genie's Cafe
 Gilda's Italian Restaurant (2010)
 Gladstone Street Pizza
 The Goose (2014)
 Goose Hollow Inn (1967)
 Gracie's Apizza
 Grassa (2013)
 The Grilled Cheese Grill (2009)
 Güero (2017)
 Ha VL (2004)
 Habibi Restaurant
 Han Oak
 Hanoi Kitchen
 Hapa PDX (2013)
 Hat Yai
 Heart Coffee Roasters
 Higgins Restaurant and Bar (1994)
 HK Cafe
 Hoda's (1999)
 Holman's Bar and Grill (1933)
 Hopworks Urban Brewery (2007)
 Horse Brass Pub (1976)
 Huber's
 Imperial Bottle Shop & Taproom (2013)
 JaCiva's Bakery and Chocolatier (1986)
 Jacqueline (2016)
 Jake's Famous Crawfish
 Jake's Grill (1994)
 Jam on Hawthorne
 JinJu Patisserie (2019)
 Joe Brown's Carmel Corn (1932)
 Joe's Cellar (1941)
 Jojo (2018)
 Kachka
 Kann
 Kay's Bar (1934)
 Kee's Loaded Kitchen
 Kells Irish Pub
 Ken's Artisan Bakery (2001)
 Ken's Artisan Pizza (2006)
 Kennedy School
 Kenny & Zuke's Delicatessen
 Kenny's Noodle House (2008)
 Kim Jong Grillin'
 Kinboshi Ramen
 Kornblatt's Delicatessen
 Kulfi (2021)
 La Bonita
 La Calaca Comelona
 Langbaan
 Lardo
 Laurelhurst Market (2009)
 Laurelwood Pub and Brewery
 Lauretta Jean's
 Lazy Susan (2020)
 Le Happy
 Le Pigeon (2006)
 Lechon (2015)
 Little T American Baker
 Lovejoy Bakers (2009)
 Lovely's Fifty Fifty
 Low Brow Lounge (1998)
 Lúc Lắc Vietnamese Kitchen (2011)
 Lucky Labrador Brewing Company
 Lutz Tavern (1947–2010; 2011–present)
 Magna Kusina (2019)
 Mama Bird
 Mama Đút (2020)
 Mama Mia Trattoria (2004)
 Maruti Indian Restaurant
 Master Kong (2018)
 Matt's BBQ (2015)
 Matta (2018)
 Maurice (2013)
 Meals 4 Heels
 Mediterranean Exploration Company
 Mis Tacones
 Mother's Bistro (2000)
 Mucca Osteria (2011)
 Multnomah Whiskey Library
 My Father's Place (1978)
 Nacheaux (2020)
 Navarre
 New Cascadia Traditional (2007)
 Nicholas Restaurant
 Nick's Famous Coney Island (1935)
 Nimblefish (2017)
 Nite Hawk Cafe and Lounge
 Nong's Khao Man Gai
 Nossa Familia Coffee (2004)
 Nostrana (2005)
 Nudi Noodle Place
 Nuestra Cocina
 Nuvrei
 Oaks Bottom Public House (2006)
 OK Omens (2018)
 Old Town Pizza (1974)
 Olive or Twist
 Olympia Provisions Public House
 Oma's Hideaway (2020)
 The Original Dinerant
 Original Hotcake House
 The Original Pancake House
 Otto's Sausage Kitchen
 Oven and Shaker
 Ox (2012)
 PaaDee (2011)
 Pal's Shanty Tavern
 Paladin Pie (2020)
 Palomar
 Pambiche Cocina and Repostería Cubana
 Papa Haydn (1978)
 Papi Chulo's (2019)
 PDX Sliders (2014)
 Philadelphia's Steaks and Hoagies (1987)
 Pho Oregon (2003)
 Phở Kim (2013)
 Pho Van (1992)
 Piattino (2013)
 Piazza Italia
 The Picnic House (2012)
 Pied Cow Coffeehouse
 Pip's Original Doughnuts & Chai
 Pix Pâtisserie (2001)
 Pizza Jerk (2015)
 Pizza Thief (2021)
 Pizzeria Otto
 Podnah's Pit Barbecue
 Por Que No (2004)
 Portland Cà Phê
 Portland City Grill (2002)
 Portland Fish Market (2014)
 Prince Coffee (2016)
 Produce Row Café (1974–2014; 2015–present)
 Prost
 Public Domain Coffee (2010)
 Quaintrelle
 Queen of Sheba (1990s)
 Radio Room (2008)
 Ramen Ryoma
 Raven's Manor (2021)
 Red Sauce Pizza (2015)
 Reel M Inn
 Reo's Ribs
 Republic Cafe and Ming Lounge (1922)
 República
 Rialto
 The Richmond Bar (2013)
 Rimsky-Korsakoffee House (1980)
 RingSide Steakhouse
 River Pig Saloon (2014)
 Rose City Book Pub (2018)
 Rose VL Deli (2015)
 Ruthie's (2020)
 Saburo's
 Sayler's Old Country Kitchen
 Scottie's Pizza Parlor
 Screen Door
 Seasons and Regions Seafood Grill
 Sebastiano's (2020)
 Shalom Y'all (2016)
 Shandong
 Shanghai Tunnel Bar
 Shanghai's Best (2018)
 Shine Distillery and Grill (2019)
 Silver Dollar Pizza
 Skyline Restaurant
 Southpark Seafood
 Space Room Lounge and Genie's Too
 Spare Room Restaurant and Lounge (1977)
 Spella Caffè
 Spirit of 77
 The Sports Bra (2022)
 St. Jack (2010)
 Stammtisch (2014)
 Steeplejack Brewing Company
 StormBreaker Brewing (2014)
 Stretch the Noodle
 Swank and Swine (2014)
 Sweedeedee (2012)
 Sweet Hereafter (2011)
 Tamale Boy
 Tanaka
 Taqueria Los Puñales (2020)
 TarBoush (2010)
 Teardrop Lounge
 Teote (2013)
 Thơm Portland (2021)
 Tierra del Sol (2015)
 Tin Shed Garden Cafe
 Toast (2007)
 Toki
 Tom's Restaurant and Bar (1975)
 Top Burmese
 Tusk
 Twisted Croissant
 Two Wrongs (2019)
 Urban Farmer
 Victoria Bar
 Viking Soul Food (2010)
 Virginia Cafe (1914)
 Virtuous Pie
 Von Ebert Brewing
 Water Avenue Coffee (2009)
 Wei Wei (2015)
 White Owl Social Club (2013)
 The Woodsman Tavern (2011–2018; 2021–present)
 Xico (2012)
 XLB (2017)
 Ya Hala
 Zach's Shack (2004)
 Zuckercreme (2021)

Defunct

 Acadia: A New Orleans Bistro
 Alexis Restaurant (1980–2016)
 Altabira City Tavern (2015–2020)
 Analog Café and Theater
 Arleta Library Bakery & Cafe
 Ataula (2013–2021)
 Aviary (2011–2020)
 Aviv (2017–2021)
 Baby Blue Pizza (2019–2022)
 Bailey's Taproom (2007–2021)
 Beast (2007–2020)
 Berlin Inn (1992–2013)
 Bijou Cafe
 Bistro Agnes (2018–2022)
 Bit House Saloon (2015–2021)
 Biwa (2007–2018)
 Bluehour (2000–2020)
 Bombay Cricket Club
 Botanist House (2018–2021)
 Brasserie Montmartre (1978–2006; 2009–2011; 2012–2015)
 Bridges Cafe (late 1990s – 2020)
 British Overseas Restaurant Corporation, formerly Saffron Colonial (2016–2019)
 Byways Cafe (1999–2019)
 Cafe Azul
 Candlelight Cafe & Bar (1984–2012)
 Canlis
 Carriage Room
 Century Bar (2016)
 Circa 33 (2010–2021)
 Clyde Common (2007–2022)
 Country Bill's (1964–2012)
 Cup & Saucer Cafe (1980s–2022)
 Davis Street Tavern (2008–2016)
 Der Rheinlander (1963–2017)
 Dick's Kitchen (2010)
 Dig a Pony (2011–2022)
 Dime Store (2014–2015)
 Dóttir (2019–2022)
 Egyptian Club
 El Gallo Taqueria (2009–2022)
 Esparza's (1990–2014)
 Everybody Eats PDX
 Fat Head's Brewery
 Fenouil (2005–2011)
 Fish Grotto
 Fong Chong
 Genoa
 Georgian Room
 Gilt Club (2005–2014)
 Greek Cusina
 Grüner (2009–2015)
 Gypsy Restaurant and Velvet Lounge (1947–2014)
 Handsome Pizza (2012–2022)
 Henry Ford's Restaurant
 Henry Thiele Restaurant (1932–1990s)
 Hobo's
 Holy Trinity Barbecue (2019–2021)
 House of Louie
 Hunan Restaurant (1979–2014)
 Hung Far Low (1928–2015)
 Irving Street Kitchen (2010–2020)
 Isabel Pearl
 Jackknife Bar (2014–2020)
 La Carreta Mexican Restaurant (1990–2020s)
 Le Bistro Montage
 Lincoln Restaurant (2008–2017)
 The Liquor Store (2015–2020)
 Little Bird Bistro (2010–2019)
 Local Lounge (2010–2021)
 Lonesome's Pizza (2010–2017)
 Lovely Hula Hands (2003–2009)
 Lucier (2008)
 Malka (2020–2023)
 Marukin Ramen
 The Matador (1971–2014)
 Mi Mero Mole (2011–2020)
 Ned Ludd
 Nel Centro (2009–2020)
 New Copper Penny
 NOLA Doughnuts
 Ocean City Seafood Restaurant (2009–2020s)
 Original Taco House (1960–2017)
 Overlook Restaurant (1974–2018)
 The Pagoda (1940–2008)
 Paley's Place (1995–2021)
 Paragon
 The Parish (2012–2016)
 Pazzo Ristorante
 Pearl Tavern (2016–2018)
 Ping (2009–2012; 2020–2021)
 Pink Feather (1957–2017)
 Pok Pok (2005–2020)
 Portland Penny Diner (2012–2017)
 Portobello Vegan Trattoria (2008–2016)
 Purrington's Cat Lounge
 The Queen's Head (2021–2022)
 Radar (2012–2022)
 Raven & Rose
 Red and Black Cafe (2000–2015)
 Revelry (2016–2020)
 RingSide Fish House (2011–2018)
 Roman Candle (2013–2018)
 The Roxy (1994–2022)
 Saucebox (1995–2020)
 Seastar Bakery
 Shift Drinks (2015–2020)
 Shut Up and Eat
 Southeast Grind (2009–2019)
 Stacked Sandwich Shop (2017–2021)
 Stanich's
 Starky's (1984–2015)
 Sunshine Noodles (2019–2022)
 Sunshine Tavern (2011–2017)
 Tails & Trotters
 Tapalaya (2008–2019)
 Tasty n Alder (2013–2020)
 Tasty n Daughters (2019–2020)
 Tasty n Sons (–2019)
 Three Sisters Tavern (1964–2004)
 Tilt (2012)
 Toro Bravo (2007–2020)
 Touché Restaurant & Bar (1995–2017)
 Vault Cocktail Lounge
 Veritable Quandary (1971–2016)
 Via Tribunali
 Victoria Station (1973–1986)
 Victory Bar (–2019)
 Whiskey Soda Lounge
 Wildwood (1994–2014)
 Wong's King (2004–2020)
 Yaw's Top Notch
 Yonder (2019–2022)
 Zefiro (1990–2000)

Restaurant chains based in Portland

 Blue Star Donuts
 Boxer Ramen (2013)
 Bunk Sandwiches
 E-san Thai Cuisine
 Elephants Delicatessen
 Grand Central Bakery
 Hot Lips Pizza
 Little Big Burger (2010)
 McCormick & Schmick's
 Olympia Provisions
 Pastini
 Pine State Biscuits (2006)
 Salt & Straw (2011)
 Sizzle Pie
 Slappy Cakes
 SuperDeluxe (2018)

Food cart pods

 Alder Street food cart pod (1990s–2019)
 Cart Blocks (2021)
 Cartlandia (2011)
 Cartopia
 Carts on Foster
 Collective Oregon Eateries (2021)
 Hawthorne Asylum (2019)
 Hinterland Bar and Food Carts
 Nob Hill Food Carts (2019)
 Portland Mercado (2015)
 Prost Marketplace

See also
 Cooperativa (Portland, Oregon) (2020–2022)
 James Beard Public Market
 Pine Street Market
 Typhoon (restaurant), based in Tigard, multiple locations in the Portland metropolitan area

Portland, Oregon
restaurants